Riemenschneider is a German surname. Notable people with the surname include:

 Albert Riemenschneider (1878 – 1950), founded the oldest collegiate Bach festival in America at Baldwin Wallace University, and founded the now Baldwin Wallace Conservatory of Music
 Karl H. Riemenschneider, the 2nd president of German Wallace College in Berea, Ohio 
 Hans-Jürgen Riemenschneider (born 1949), German sprint canoer
 Tilman Riemenschneider (c. 1460 – 1531), German sculptor and woodcarver

See also 
 Grauert–Riemenschneider vanishing theorem
 6145 Riemenschneider, main-belt asteroid

German-language surnames